Jiucheng Administration Branch is a prison in Wangjiang County, Anhui, China established in 1957. It is one of the province's 2 largest agricultural prisons. It controls 5 large-scale prisons including Bohu, Dongjiaohu, Menghu, Huanghu, and Majiahu. In 2002, the prison shifted from agriculture to the service industry. In 2005 it housed roughly 5,000 inmates whose labor is used to produce clothing, wool sweaters for export, to work with silver paper processing, and to continue with agricultural production. Inmates are forced to work up to 16 hours a day.

See also
List of prisons in Anhui

References

Laogai Research Foundation Handbook

Prisons in Anhui
Government agencies established in 1957
Buildings and structures in Anqing